Grace Rhys  (née Little, 1865–1929) was an Irish writer brought up in Boyle, County Roscommon.

Biography
Joseph Bennet Little, her landowner father, lost his money through gambling and, after receiving a good education from governesses, she and her sisters had to move to London as adults to earn a living.

She was both wife and literary companion to Ernest Percival Rhys whom she met at a garden party given by Yeats. They married in 1891 and sometimes worked side by side in the British Museum. Her first novel, Mary Dominic, was published in 1898. Several of her stories have an Irish setting, including The Charming of Estercel (1904) set in Elizabethan Ireland, which was illustrated by Howard Pyle in Harper's Magazine.

Her other work includes The Wooing of Sheila (1901), The Bride (1909), and Five Beads on a String (1907), a book of essays. She also wrote poetry and books for children, and had a son and two daughters of her own.

The Rhyses were known for entertaining writers and critics at their London home on Sunday afternoons.  Grace died at a hotel in Washington DC while accompanying her husband on an American lecture tour.

References

Sources
 Oxford Companion to Edwardian Fiction 1900–14: New Voices in the Age of Uncertainty, ed. Kemp, Mitchell, Trotter (OUP, 1997)
 Katharine Chubbuck, Ernest Percival Rhys in the Oxford Dictionary of National Biography (2004)

External links
 
 
 

1865 births
1929 deaths
Irish novelists
People from County Roscommon
Irish women novelists